Morez is a former commune of the Jura department in Bourgogne-Franche-Comté in eastern France. On 1 January 2016, it was merged into the new commune of Hauts de Bienne.

The town is mostly known for the manufacture of spectacles. From 1680 to 1920, Morez was with Morbier the center of Comtoise clock production.

Population

Gallery

See also 
 Communes of the Jura department

References 

Former communes of Jura (department)
Populated places disestablished in 2016